Seneca Caverns may refer to:

Seneca Caverns (Ohio)
Seneca Caverns (West Virginia)